Howard da Silva (born Howard Silverblatt, May 4, 1909 – February 16, 1986) was an American actor, director and musical performer on stage, film, television and radio.  He was cast in dozens of productions on the New York stage, appeared in more than two dozen television programs, and acted in more than fifty feature films. Adept at both drama and musicals on the stage, he originated the role of Jud Fry in the original 1943 run of the Rodgers and Hammerstein musical Oklahoma!, and also portrayed the prosecuting attorney in the 1957 stage production of Compulsion.  Da Silva was nominated for a 1960 Tony Award as Best Featured Actor in a Musical for his work in Fiorello!, a musical about New York City mayor LaGuardia.  In 1961, da Silva directed Purlie Victorious, by Ossie Davis.

Many of his early feature films were of the noir genre in which he often played villains, such as Eddie Harwood in The Blue Dahlia and the sadistic Captain Francis Thompson in Two Years Before the Mast (both 1946). Da Silva's characterization of historic figures are among some of his most notable work: he was Lincoln's brawling friend Jack Armstrong in both play (1939) and film (1940) versions of Abe Lincoln in Illinois written by Robert Sherwood; Benjamin Franklin in the 1969–1972 stage musical 1776 and a reprisal of the role for the 1972 film version of the production; Soviet leader Nikita Khrushchev in The Missiles of October (1974); Franklin D. Roosevelt in The Private Files of J. Edgar Hoover (1977); and Louis B. Mayer in Mommie Dearest (1981).

Da Silva's American television character work included the defense attorney representing the robot in  The Outer Limits episode "I, Robot" (1964), and district attorney Anthony Cleese in For the People (1965).  For his performance as Eddie in the Great Performances production of Verna: USO Girl (1978), the actor received a Primetime Emmy Award for Outstanding Performance by a Supporting Actor in a Comedy or Drama Special.

In the 1970s, da Silva appeared in 26 episodes of the radio series, the CBS Radio Mystery Theater.

Early life
Da Silva was born in Cleveland, Ohio, the son of Bertha (née Sen) and Benjamin Silverblatt, a dress cutter. His parents were both Yiddish-speaking Jews born in Russia. His mother was a women's-rights activist. Before beginning his acting career on the stage, he was employed as a steelworker.

Da Silva was a graduate of the Carnegie Institute of Technology and studied acting with Eva Le Gallienne beginning in 1928 at the Civic Repertory Theatre. He changed his surname to the Portuguese Da Silva (the name is sometimes misspelled Howard De Silva).

Career

Da Silva appeared in a number of Broadway musicals, including the role of Larry Foreman in the legendary first production of Marc Blitzstein's musical, The Cradle Will Rock (1938).  Later, he costarred in the original 1943 stage production of Rodgers and Hammerstein's Oklahoma!, playing the role of the psychopathic Jud Fry.  He was the easygoing Ben Marino who opposed Tammany Hall in the Pulitzer winning musical Fiorello!.

In 1969, da Silva originated the role of Benjamin Franklin in the musical 1776. Four days before the show opened on Broadway, he suffered a minor heart attack but refused to seek medical assistance because he wanted to make sure critics saw his performance.  After the four official critic performances were over, the cast left to go to the cast party and da Silva went to the hospital and immediately took a leave of absence from the production.  While da Silva recuperated, his understudy, Rex Everhart, took over the role and performed on the cast recording. Da Silva was able to reprise his role in the 1972 film version and appeared on that soundtrack album.

Da Silva did summer stock at the Pine Brook Country Club, located in the countryside of Nichols, Connecticut, with the Group Theatre (New York) formed by Harold Clurman, Cheryl Crawford and Lee Strasberg in the 1930s and early 1940s.

Da Silva appeared in over 60 motion pictures. Some of his memorable roles include a leading mutineer in The Sea Wolf (1941), playing Ray Milland's bartender in The Lost Weekend (1945), and the half-blind criminal "Chicamaw 'One-Eye' Mobley" in They Live by Night (1949).  He also released an album on Monitor Records (MP 595) of political songs and ballads entitled Politics and Poker.

Da Silva returned to the stage, and was nominated for the 1960 Tony Award for Best Featured Actor in a Musical for his role as "Ben Marino" in Fiorello! (1959). After being blacklisted, da Silva and Nelson left Los Angeles for New York to perform in The World of Sholom Aleichem.

Da Silva was nominated for the British BAFTA Film Award for Best Foreign Actor for his performance as Dr. Swinford in David and Lisa (1962). Da Silva portrayed Soviet Premier Khrushchev in the television docudrama The Missiles of October (1974). He won the Emmy Award for Outstanding Performance by a Supporting Actor in a Comedy or Drama Special for his role as Eddie in Verna: U.S.O. Girl (1978) with Sissy Spacek.

Da Silva's TV guest appearances, after the era in which blacklisting was strongest, include such programs as The Outer Limits, Ben Casey, The Man from U.N.C.L.E., The Fugitive, Gentle Ben, Mannix, Love, American Style, Kung Fu, and Archie Bunker's Place.

Da Silva also played President Franklin D. Roosevelt in The Private Files of J. Edgar Hoover (1977), Hollywood mogul Louis B. Mayer in Mommie Dearest (1981), and American statesman Benjamin Franklin in 1776 (1972), as well as a documentary depicting the life of Ben Franklin shown at Franklin's house in Philadelphia. He appeared in two different film adaptations of F. Scott Fitzgerald's 1925 novel, The Great Gatsby. In the 1949 production with Alan Ladd as Gatsby, da Silva played garage owner George Wilson; in the 1974 film with Robert Redford, da Silva was Meyer Wolfsheim, the flamboyant gambler with the interesting cufflinks. In his final appearance on screen, da Silva played a New York photographer fascinated with the reclusive Greta Garbo in the film Garbo Talks (1984), directed by Sidney Lumet.

He also did voice acting in 26 episodes of the popular 1974–82 radio thriller series CBS Radio Mystery Theater (between July 1974 and February 1977). In 1978, he recorded linking narration for episodes of the British television program Doctor Who broadcast in the United States.

Blacklisting
Da Silva became one of hundreds of artists blacklisted in the entertainment industry during the House Committee on Unamerican Activities investigation into alleged Communist influence in the industry. Following his March 1951 testimony in which he repeatedly invoked his Fifth Amendment rights, his lead performance in the completed feature film Slaughter Trail was re-shot with actor Brian Donlevy.  Da Silva continued to find work on the New York stage, but did not work in feature films again until 1961 when he appeared in David and Lisa (a BAFTA-nominated performance).  He was eventually cleared of any charges in 1960, but not before his career in television had also stalled, with no work between 1951 and 1959 when he appeared in The Play of the Week. The brief respite was followed by another television career void until his appearance in a 1963 episode of The Defenders. That was the beginning of the end of da Silva's blacklist, and the show's producer Herb Brodkin paired da Silva with William Shatner when he created the television series For the People.

Personal life and death
Da Silva's first wife was Evelyn Horowitz. They were married on August 13, 1930, in Manhattan, New York City, when da Silva was a member of Eva LeGallienne's Civic Repertory Company. His marriage was kept a secret for awhile as Le Gallienne did not want members of her company to be distracted by marriage entanglements. The da Silvas were politically active and were involved in the movement to support the loyalists in Spain among other causes. They were later divorced.

His second wife was stage actress Jane Louise Taylor, born in 1913 in New York. They were married in January 1941 in Yuma, Arizona, and had one son. They were divorced on July 28, 1948 in Los Angeles, California. 

His third wife was actress Marjorie Nelson; they were married on August 19, 1950, in Hollywood, California. Da Silva and Nelson had two daughters and were divorced on May 9, 1961, in Juárez, Mexico.

His fourth wife was Nancy Nutter; they were married in May or June 1961 in Greenwich, England. They had one son and one daughter.

Da Silva died of lymphoma, aged 76, in Ossining, New York.

Acting credits

Stage

Film

Television

Doctor Who
Howard da Silva  provided linking narration for North American broadcasts of Doctor Who, providing continuity announcements for episodes from season 12 through season 15, ostensibly to help North American audiences get acclimatized to the nature of serial storytelling, which was then uncommon on non-soap-operatic television in the United States and Canada. His narration accompanied the earliest runs of Doctor Who as broadcast on American PBS stations and Canadian broadcasters like TVOntario during the 1970s and early 1980s. Typically, after Doctor Who had been run on a station for a while, the linking narration was removed as unnecessary. Nevertheless, the announcements were so familiar a part of some viewers' experience of Doctor Who that they became a standard extra feature on BBC DVD releases of early Tom Baker serials.

Radio
From 1974 to 1977, da Silva was a regular player on CBS Radio Mystery Theater.

Citations

References

External links

 
 
 CBS Radio Mystery Theater at Internet Archive 
 Howard da Silva at Film Reference
 Politics and Poker on Folkways Records

1909 births
1986 deaths
American male film actors
American male musical theatre actors
American male stage actors
American male television actors
American people of Russian-Jewish descent
Deaths from cancer in New York (state)
Deaths from lymphoma
Hollywood blacklist
Jewish American male actors
Outstanding Performance by a Supporting Actor in a Miniseries or Movie Primetime Emmy Award winners
Male actors from Cleveland
Singers from Ohio
20th-century American male actors
20th-century American singers
American male radio actors
20th-century American male singers
20th-century American Jews
Federal Theatre Project people